Dilpreet Bhatia is an Indian singer-songwriter and technologist, born in Ludhiana in a Punjabi Sikh family. His song Tere Bin Dil, won in World Music Category of International Songwriting Competition.
In September 2014, he was selected as Grand Prize winner in Season I of John Lennon Songwriting Contest in the World Music category.

Discography

References

Indian male singer-songwriters
Indian singer-songwriters
Living people
Punjabi-language singers
Singers from Punjab, India
Year of birth missing (living people)